Geoffrey Chukwunenye is an Anglican bishop in Nigeria.

Chukwunenye was consecrated the inaugural Bishop of Oru  on 16 July 2008 at the Cathedral Church of Emmanuel, Mgbidi.

Notes

Living people
Anglican bishops of Oru
21st-century Anglican bishops in Nigeria
Year of birth missing (living people)